Ben Houge (born 1974) is an American composer and audio designer. He has worked on many projects, including composing music and designing audio for video games since 1996. He contributed to popular titles during his seven years of association with Sierra On-Line including developing audio for the Half-Life series and Arcanum: Of Steamworks and Magick Obscura. In 2003, Houge left Sierra to work as a freelance audio designer and later joined the video game corporation Ubisoft. Much of his work employs computers to make decisions and generate sound, and he has incorporated ideas from his experience in digital media into compositions for live performance. He received his Bachelor of Arts degree (B.A.) in Music Theory from St. Olaf College and his Master of Music degree (M.M.) from the University of Washington and is currently an assistant professor at Berklee College of Music.

Houge's work on "food operas," that is, electronic music environments for dining that adapt to the dishes and courses being served to each dinner or table of dinners, has been extensively noted in the press.

Discography
 The Tomb of the Grammarian Lysias (2014)
 Chroma (Cancelled), Harmonix
 Defense Grid: You Monster (2011), Hidden Path Entertainment
 Tom Clancy's EndWar (2008), Ubisoft
 Brothers in Arms: Road to Hill 30 (2005), Ubisoft
 Half-Life (PlayStation 2) (2001), Sierra On-Line
 Arcanum: Of Steamworks and Magick Obscura (2001), Sierra On-Line
 Half-Life: Blue Shift (2001), Sierra On-Line
 Ground Control (2000), Sierra On-Line
 SWAT 3: Close Quarters Battle (1999), Sierra On-Line
 Half-Life: Opposing Force (1999), Sierra On-Line
 Gabriel Knight 3: Blood of the Sacred, Blood of the Damned (1999), Sierra On-Line
 King's Quest: Mask of Eternity (1998), Sierra On-Line
 Leisure Suit Larry's Casino (1998), Sierra On-Line
 Sierra's 'splash' screen (1998-2001), Sierra On-Line
 Leisure Suit Larry: Love for Sail! (1996), Sierra On-Line
 Mythica (Cancelled), Microsoft Studios
 Hoyle Casino Empire (2002), Sierra On-Line
 Jonny Drama (Cancelled), Sierra On-Line

References

External links
 
 Faculty - Ben Houge, Assistant Professor 
 
 Musical Gamescapes: A Study of Unity in Arcanum: Of Steamworks and Magick Obscura By: Tristan Capacchione 

1974 births
Living people
American male composers
St. Olaf College alumni
University of Washington School of Music alumni
21st-century American composers
Berklee College of Music faculty
American music educators
People from York, Nebraska
Musicians from Nebraska
21st-century American male musicians